Puccinelli is an Italian surname. Notable people with the surname include:

Aldo Puccinelli (1920–1994), Italian footballer
André Puccinelli (born 1948), Brazilian politician
Angelo Puccinelli, Italian painter
Dorothy Wagner Puccinelli (1901–1974), American artist
George Puccinelli (1907–1956), American baseball player
Keith Puccinelli (1950–2017), American artist
Luca Puccinelli (born 1973), Italian footballer
Placido Puccinelli (1609–1685), Italian Christian monk and historian

Italian-language surnames